"Dammit" (sometimes subtitled "Growing Up") is a song by American rock band Blink-182, released on September 23, 1997, as the second single from the group's second studio album, Dude Ranch (1997). Written by bassist Mark Hoppus, the song concerns maturity and growing older. It was written about a fictional breakup and the difficulty of seeing a former partner with another.

The song became the band's first hit single, reaching number 11 on Billboard Hot Modern Rock Tracks chart, and receiving heavy airplay on several key US stations. The song's music video was shot by directors Darren Doane and Ken Daurio, previous collaborators with the group, and depicts the trio attending a "sneak preview" at a cinema where Hoppus attempts to win his ex-girlfriend back. "Dammit" was later featured on the band's Greatest Hits (with a drumroll added), and it has been covered by a number of artists.

Background

Blink-182 bassist Mark Hoppus wrote the song in a short span of time concerning a fictional breakup with a girlfriend. Hoppus described a scenario, detailed in the lyrics, where former lovers meet in public and one is with someone new, "It really hurts when you aren't the person feeling the love, but you have to act like it's cool to save face." He felt the song's creation, which was spontaneous, worked to its favor: "If you work on a song for weeks and weeks, you're forcing it." The signature guitar line for "Dammit" was created on an acoustic guitar that was missing two strings. Guitarist Tom DeLonge considered the song a breakthrough in the band's songwriting.

The song was recorded between December 1996 and January 1997 at Big Fish Studios in Encinitas, California. The song was written just outside Hoppus' vocal range, requiring him to strain to sing it (the song has a noticeably rougher and scratchier vocal track than the rest of the album). Hoppus was having vocal problems during the recording of the album regardless, due to lack of vocal warm-ups and constant smoking. These factors, combined with the stress of recording "Dammit", led Hoppus to strain his vocal cords significantly, forcing the band to cancel the final week of recording the album in December 1996. "I actually like my voice a lot on 'Dammit'. It sounds really raw and cool," said Hoppus in 2001. "But it's not a technique I would recommend for getting a good vocal sound. You know, smoking, yelling, all that." As a result of this incident, the chorus has always been sung by Tom DeLonge in live performances. Guitarist/vocalist Matt Skiba would also take the lead on the chorus after replacing DeLonge in 2015.

"Dammit" is set in the time signature of common time, with a fast tempo of 215 beats per minute. It is composed in the key of C major with Hoppus's vocals spanning the tonal nodes of C4 to G4. The song follows a common chord progression sequence of I–V–vi–IV.

Commercial performance

"Dammit" received heavy radio airplay at many key radio stations, and became the band's first hit single. MCA Records' retail plan for the single involved releasing it after the band's stint on the 1997 Vans Warped Tour in order to secure a story to help promote it to radio. The label first began to promote "Dammit"  in August 1997 and several stations in Southern California were quick to begin playing the song, finding it to be a good match alongside Green Day and The Offspring radio hits. Stations such as KOME in San Jose were among the first to play the song. The song was released in September, and broke through to rock radio when it was added to the playlist of Los Angeles-based KROQ. Mainstream rock radio received "Dammit" in November, and MTV picked up the "Dammit" video, where it began receiving heavy rotation in December. This led to feature stories in magazines such as Billboard and Rolling Stone.

The song peaked at number 11 on Billboard Hot Modern Rock Tracks chart, spending 28 weeks on the chart. It also spent nine weeks on the Mainstream Rock Tracks chart, peaking at number 26. Lastly, it charted on the airplay chart of the all-genre Billboard Hot 100, staying for nine weeks and hitting number 61. Billboard Airplay Monitor Report (BDS) figures reported that the record had received over 1,000 spins on KROQ, placing it as the second-most played track of 1998. It ranked third in terms of total airplay on Seattle's KNDD and New York's WXRK, attaining 900 plays on both respective stations. "Dammit" was among the top three most-played songs on San Francisco's KITS, Boston's WBCN, Detroit's CIMX and Sacramento's KWOD for the year. KEDJ of Phoenix played "Dammit" over 1,400 times over the course of the year. The song was called a modern rock "radio staple" by the Los Angeles Times. The song's success was largely responsible for pushing Dude Ranch to receive a gold certification from the Recording Industry Association of America for selling 500,000 copies. The song spent six weeks on RPM Alternative 30 in Canada between April and May 1998, peaking at number 15. In addition, to its success in North America, the song peaked at number 34 on the ARIA Top 100 Singles Chart in Australia, where it spent sixteen weeks on the chart between December 1997 and April 1998.

The song's success stunned the group. Guitarist Tom DeLonge, who noted that many of the band's songs were based on real events, found it unusual that a song that was not directly autobiographical wound up connecting best with the wide audience. Later, he recalled, "[When 'Dammit' took off], we were freaking. We couldn't believe what was happening to us." Meanwhile, Hoppus, as a result of the single's success, began introducing himself to people as "that guy that wrote, 'duh nuh nuh nuh nuh duh nuh nuh nuh nuh, he fucked her.'"

Reception
Scott Heisel of Alternative Press called "Dammit" the "perfect punk song, everyone knows it, and it's probably being covered in someone's basement right now." In a contemporary review, MTV News' Chris Nelson wrote, ""Dammit"'s staccato rhythm and melancholy pop-spirit call to mind Chicago punks Screeching Weasel as much as they do the emotional fretting of the Descendents." Consequence of Sound, in a 2015 top 10 of Blink-182's best songs, ranked "Dammit" at number one, commenting, "The best songwriters don't capture what you're going through individually in your life – they capture the things that are common to all humanity, and there's something about "Dammit"'s chorus, something about its opening C, D, E riff that sounds universal." Complex in 2012 examined the song through the lens of its inclusion in Can't Hardly Wait (1998), calling it, "one of the most iconic songs of the 90s – those three, unmistakable guitar chords, the two voices trading in verse (one sneering punk, the other, a throaty few octaves lower), and a soaring punk chorus." At Billboard, it is described as a "jump-around pop punk song". Stereogum and Kerrang both named "Dammit" as Blink-182's best song.

In popular culture
The song was featured in the 1998 teen film Can't Hardly Wait, during a scene in which the police break up a house party. The song was also featured in the television series Dawson's Creek in episode 8 of Season 1.

The song was also included in the music video game Guitar Hero World Tour, along with an in-game representation of Travis Barker, who becomes available to play upon completing the song in the drum career.

"Dammit" has been covered by a number of artists, including All Time Low, Cloud Control, Lisa Prank, FIDLAR, Good Charlotte, Of Mice & Men and Pierce the Veil, Best Coast and Skatune Network. Rapper Lil Peep often included a karaoke crowd-singalong cover of Dammit during live shows in 2017.

Music video
The music video for "Dammit" stars Hoppus attempting to take his ex-girlfriend away from her new lover at a cinema. Band manager Rick DeVoe has a cameo appearance in the clip as a snack bar attendant. The music video for "Dammit" was directed by Darren Doane and Ken Daurio, who also directed the band's first clip for "M+M's" in 1995. Doane allowed the musicians to improvise during the shoot. Hoppus and guitarist Tom DeLonge were so taken with the way DeVoe portrayed his character they requested Doane work his character into more screen time. Near the end of the bridge, during intercut performance footage of the group, DeLonge mouths to Hoppus a visible "I love you." A poster for the film Farinelli (1994) is visible behind the concession counter.

In 2011, Hoppus auctioned off band memorabilia to help donate to victims of the Tōhoku earthquake and tsunami, one of which was his orange sweater he wore in the "Dammit" video.

Track listings
US CD (1997)
 "Dammit" (Tom Lord-Alge remix; radio edit) – 2:46
 "Dammit" (Tom Lord-Alge remix)  – 2:46

Australian CD (1997)
 "Dammit" (Tom Lord-Alge remix; radio edit) – 2:46
 "Dammit" (Tom Lord-Alge remix) – 2:46
 "Zulu" – 2:07

Credits and personnel
Credits adapted from the liner notes of Dude Ranch.

Locations
 Recorded at Big Fish Studios, Encinitas, California.
 Mixed at Track Record Studios, North Hollywood, California.

Blink-182
 Mark Hoppus – bass guitar, vocals
 Tom DeLonge – guitars
 Scott Raynor – drums

Production
 Mark Trombino – production, recording, mixing
 Brian Gardner – mastering
 Tom Lord-Alge – remix

Charts

Weekly charts

Year-end charts

Certifications

References

Footnotes

Sources
 
 

1997 singles
1997 songs
Blink-182 songs
Songs written by Mark Hoppus
Songs written by Tom DeLonge
Songs containing the I–V-vi-IV progression